The 2009–10 season was the 19th edition of Europe's premier basketball tournament for women - EuroLeague Women since it was rebranded to its current format.

Group stage

Group D

Knockout stage

Round of 16

Round of 8

 if necessary

External links
  FIBA Europe website
  EuroLeague Women official website

Fenerbahçe Basketball